Beni Prasad Verma (11 February 1941 – 27 March 2020) was an Indian politician and a member of the Samajwadi Party. Earlier he was with Samajwadi Party of Mulayam Singh Yadav, then he joined Indian National Congress and was elected on its ticket to Lok Sabha in 2009. In 2016 he rejoined Samajwadi Party.

Personal life
Verma was born in Barabanki, Uttar Pradesh into a Kurmi family.

Political career
Beni Prasad Verma was the steel Minister of the Indian Government. He was the Public Works Department minister for the State of Uttar Pradesh in India for several years.

He served as the Union Communications Minister in Deve Gowda's cabinet from 1996–98.

He was re-elected to the Lok Sabha in 1998, 1999 and 2004 from Kaiserganj constituency seat. In 2009, he was re-elected to the Lok Sabha from Gonda constituency in Uttar Pradesh state as an Indian National Congress candidate and on July-12-2011 was appointed the Steel Minister in Manmohan Singh Government.

In 2016, he rejoined the Samajwadi Party.

Educational institutes
Beni Prasad Verma has established educational institutions Chaudhary Charan Singh Mahavidyalaya at Bardari near Badosarai and Mohanlal Verma Educational Institute in his home district of Barabanki.

Views

Beni Prasad Verma criticized B. R. Ambedkar by saying "Ambedkar did nothing else except create trouble for Gandhiji."

In December 2009 during a debate session in Lok Sabha, Beni Prasad had made controversial remarks for Former Prime Minister Mr. Atal Bihari Vajpayee, he used "man of low stands" for Mr. Vajpayee. This created serious agitation among BJP leaders protested immediately by shouting, they stalled parliament and demanded an apology. Home Minister P Chidambaram apologized for  the remark, but the BJP said it would boycott the Lok Sabha till Verma apologises, But Verma refused to apologise.

On the next day, the then prime minister had apologised in the parliament for the controversial remark against the former prime minister. He said, "A member of our ruling coalition said something that was inappropriate; with regard to Vajpayee those words were used. I on behalf of our government apologise that those words should not have been used."

In  February 2012, during the Uttar Pradesh elections Verma dared EC to arrest him, saying quota for Muslims will be hiked. Verma said this while addressing a rally at Kaimganj in the presence of Congress general secretary Digvijay Singh and Union law and minority affairs minister Salman Khurshid.
Earlier, Khurshid created a controversy by stating that he would continue to speak on nine percent sub-quota for Muslims even if the Election Commission says it's against the guideline to promise such a thing during the elections.

On 19 August 2012 he made a remark in Barabanki, Uttar Pradesh that "With the increasing price levels, the farmers are benefitting. Dal, atta, vegetables have all become expensive. I am happy with this price rise. The more the prices rise the better it is for farmers," the minister said
.

On 15 October 2012, he made a controversial remark that "I believe Salman Khurshid could not have embezzled Rs 71 lakh. It is a very small amount for a central minister. I would have taken it seriously if the amount was Rs 71 crore." The Times of India said his statements are grossly ill-timed and ill-phrased.

On 13 December 2012, he made a remark that "Do not hang Afzal Guru but give him life imprisonment".

In December 2013, when he asked about Kumar Vishwas standing against Rahul Gandhi in the election from Rahul Gandhi's home place Amethi he said, "what will he fight, how will he fight. He is nothing but a joker. There are so many jokers already, he can join them."

In 2016, he blamed Rashtriya Swayamsevak Sangh (RSS) for assassination of Mahatma Gandhi and added that "When Mahatma Gandhi was assassinated, RSS workers were told in advance to keep their radio sets on for they will get to hear good news."

References

External links

 Detailed profile: Beni Prasad Verma in India.gov.in website

1941 births
2020 deaths
Indian National Congress politicians
Samajwadi Party politicians
People from Barabanki, Uttar Pradesh
Lok Sabha members from Uttar Pradesh
United Progressive Alliance candidates in the 2014 Indian general election
Members of the Cabinet of India
Rajya Sabha members from Uttar Pradesh
India MPs 1996–1997
India MPs 1998–1999
India MPs 1999–2004
India MPs 2004–2009
India MPs 2009–2014
People from Gonda district
People from Bahraich district
Steel Ministers of India
Deaths from the COVID-19 pandemic in India